Handsacre is a village in the English county of Staffordshire, England. Population details taken at the 2011 census can be found under Armitage with Handsacre

Location 
The village lies east of the larger village of Armitage. The village sits astride of the A513 road which runs from Tamworth to Stafford.

Village services
Handsacre has one shop, which is a convenience store. There is also a Chinese food take-away and a fish and chip shop. There are two pubs in within the village. The public houses are called The Old Peculiar and The Crown.  The Crown is adjacent to the canal and has a beer garden. The Old Peculiar is on the corner of Hall Road. The Poplar's Pub on Tuppenhurst Lane closed in 2008 and was demolished in June 2010. As of June 2011, twenty houses have been built and are currently occupied.

Schools 
The village school is called Hayes Meadow Primary School. The school cater for children from the age of 3 plus, who attend the purpose built nursery unit, to the age of 11. The Headteacher is B J Luck (retrieved 11 April 2013)  The school is also home to its PTA organisation, The Friends of Hayes Meadow (Charity number 1087977). The charity organises events such as Summer Fayres, BBQ's, Craft Fairs and the most successful fundraiser, the Santa Float. Events like these allow the charity to provide students with extra things such as climbing frames, play equipment, selection boxes etc.

Playgrounds 
There is a children's play park at the end of Harvey Road on St Barbara's Road in the north easterly part of the village. The playpark was refurbished in 2009.

Transport 
The village is currently served 6 days per week by Chaserider bus services 826 and 828. These link the village with Rugeley and Stafford in the west direction, and Lichfield south east.

Trent and Mersey Canal
The Trent and Mersey Canal skirts around the northern edge of the village. This canal was designed and built by James Brindley who died in 1777, before the canal was completed. The A513 road crosses the canal with the Crown public house next to the bridge designated bridge 56 here. This bridge is a little way west of two further bridges which cross the canal which are Grade II listed structures. these bridges are designated bridges 59 and 60.

Rail
The new High Speed 2 rail line is planned to join with the West Coast Main line near Handsacre.

Population
Handsacre has a population of 5,355 people living in the ward of Armitage with Handsacre.

See also
Listed buildings in Armitage with Handsacre

Gallery

References 

Villages in Staffordshire
Lichfield District